The Wildfowl & Wetlands Trust (WWT) is an international wildfowl and wetland conservation charity in the United Kingdom. Its patron is Charles III, and its president is Kate Humble.

History

The WWT was founded in 1946 by the ornithologist and artist Sir Peter Scott as the Severn Wildfowl Trust.

The first site at Slimbridge was a centre for research and conservation. In a move unusual at the time, he opened the site to the public so that everyone could enjoy access to nature.

This modest beginning developed in time into the formation of the Wildfowl & Wetlands Trust, the only United Kingdom charity to promote the protection of wetland birds and their habitats, both in Britain and internationally. Although starting out at Slimbridge, the Wildfowl & Wetlands Trust now owns or manages nine other reserves in Britain, and advocates for wetlands and conservation issues world-wide. WWT Consulting is an offshoot of the Wildlife & Wetland Trust and is based at Slimbridge. It provides ecological surveys and assessments, and offers consultancy services in wetland habitat design, wetland management, biological waste-water treatment systems and the management of reserves and their visitor centres. The Queen in later years became Patron to the WWT, and Prince Charles became the President.

The WWT was instrumental in saving the nēnē from the brink of extinction in the 1950s.

Nature reserves

The WWT has over 200,000 members and ten reserves with visitor centres. Together these cover over 20 km2, and support over 150,000 birds. They receive over one million visitors per year. The reserves include seven SSSIs (site of Special Scientific Interest), five SPAs (Special Protection Areas) and five Ramsar sites.

WWT Arundel, West Sussex
WWT Caerlaverock, Dumfries and Galloway, Scotland (the only centre with accommodation)
WWT Castle Espie, County Down, Northern Ireland
WWT London Wetland Centre 
WWT Llanelli Wetlands Centre, Carmarthenshire, Wales
WWT Martin Mere, Lancashire
WWT Slimbridge, Gloucestershire
WWT Steart, Somerset
WWT Washington, Tyne and Wear
WWT Welney, Norfolk

Consultancy

WWT also operates a consultancy business that provides external clients with a comprehensive range of wetland services. These include ecological survey and assessment, habitat design and management, visitor centre planning and design, and wetland treatment systems.

Organisation 
The Wildfowl & Wetlands Trust is a registered charity in England and Scotland. Martin Spray has been chief executive WWT since March 2004. In December 2012, he was appointed CBE.

See also

 Conservation in the United Kingdom
 Index of conservation articles
 Malcolm Ogilvie
 Janet Kear
 Ramsar Convention
 Wetlands International

References

External links

 
1946 establishments in the United Kingdom
Environmental organisations based in the United Kingdom
Animal charities based in the United Kingdom
Ornithological organisations in the United Kingdom
Wetlands organizations
Charities based in Gloucestershire